Franz Grothe (17 September 1908 – 12 September 1982) was a German composer, mainly for the cinema. His musicals were outstanding successes. He was required to be a member of the Nazi party (No. 2.580.427).

Selected filmography
 The Night Belongs to Us (1929)
 The Last Company (1930)
 Boycott (1930)
 Love Songs (1930)
 The Big Attraction (1931)
 Ronny (1931)
 The Unfaithful Eckehart (1931)
 The House of Dora Green (1933)
 And Who Is Kissing Me? (1933)
 The Girl with the Bruise (1933)
 The Castle in the South (1933)
 Tell Me Who You Are (1933)
 Dream Castle (1933)
 The Gentleman from Maxim's (1933)
 Waltz War (1933)
 The Big Bluff (1933)
 Heinz in the Moon (1934)
 Between Two Hearts (1934)
 So Ended a Great Love (1934)
 Miss Madame (1934)
 Peter, Paul and Nanette (1935)
 Winter Night's Dream (1935)
 The Blonde Carmen (1935)
 The Valley of Love (1935)
 A Woman Between Two Worlds (1936)
 The Love of the Maharaja (1936)
 The Castle in Flanders (1936)
 Red Orchids (1938)
 Napoleon Is to Blame for Everything (1938)
 Secret Code LB 17 (1938)
The Secret Lie (1938)
 Alarm at Station III (1939)
 Marriage in Small Doses (1939)
 The Curtain Falls (1939)
 Der singende Tor (1939)
 Roses in Tyrol (1940)
 Women Are Better Diplomats (1941)
 The Swedish Nightingale (1941)
 Love Me (1942)
 I Entrust My Wife to You (1943)
 The Eternal Tone (1943)
 Love Premiere (1943)
 Don't Play with Love (1949)
 Nothing But Coincidence (1949) 
 Derby (1949)
 Unknown Sender (1950)
 Taxi-Kitty (1950)
 Beloved Liar (1950)
 Harbour Melody (1950)
 Furioso (1950)
 Doctor Praetorius (1950)
 Chased by the Devil (1950)
 The Beautiful Galatea (1950)
 The House in Montevideo (1951)
 Fanfares of Love (1951)
 The Blue Star of the South (1951)
 Father Needs a Wife (1952)
 Must We Get Divorced? (1953)
 Hocuspocus (1953)
 Stars Over Colombo (1953)
 Fanfare of Marriage (1953)
 Scandal at the Girls' School (1953)
 They Call It Love (1953)
 The Blue Hour (1953)
 Ave Maria (1953)
 A Parisian in Rome (1954)
 Portrait of an Unknown Woman (1954)
 I Often Think of Piroschka (1955)
 Roses in Autumn (1955)
 The Blue Danube (1955)
 A Girl Without Boundaries (1955)
 Three Girls from the Rhine (1955)
 The Golden Bridge (1956)
 If We All Were Angels (1956)
 Queen Louise (1957)
 The Saint and Her Fool (1957)
 Goodbye, Franziska (1957)
 A Piece of Heaven (1957)
 Salzburg Stories (1957)
 Wir Wunderkinder (1958)
 The Trapp Family in America (1958)
 The Priest and the Girl (1958)
 The Man Who Walked Through the Wall (1959)
 The Angel Who Pawned Her Harp (1959)
 Old Heidelberg (1959)
 Twelve Girls and One Man (1959)
 Jacqueline (1959)
 The Last Pedestrian (1960)
 Stage Fright (1960)
 Sweetheart of the Gods (1960)
 Two Among Millions (1961)
 The House in Montevideo (1963)
 My Daughter and I (1963)
 A Mission for Mr. Dodd (1964)
 Praetorius (1965)
 Liselotte of the Palatinate (1966)

References

Bibliography
 Kater, Michael H. Composers of the Nazi Era: Eight Portraits. Oxford University Press, 2000

External links

1908 births
1982 deaths
German film score composers
Male film score composers
German male composers
Musicians from Berlin
Nazi Party members
20th-century German composers
20th-century German male musicians
Commanders Crosses of the Order of Merit of the Federal Republic of Germany